The Bishop of Annaghdown (or Annadown, Enachdune, Eanach Dúin) is an episcopal title which takes its name after the small village of Annaghdown in County Galway, Republic of Ireland.

The bishop was originally the ordinary of the diocese of Annaghdown, which was established in the 12th century. The cathedral had a dean, chapter and four vicars choral. Between 1253 and 1306, the bishopric was united to the archbishopric of Tuam, although in this period there were two bishops.

During the Reformation, there were two bishoprics; one of the Church of Ireland and the other of the Roman Catholic Church. They were re-united under Queen Mary I. After 1555, Annaghdown was held by the Archbishops of Tuam. The union of the two was finally decreed on 17 October 1580.

In 1970, the Roman Catholic Church revived the title as the Titular Bishop of Eanach Dúin. It is currently held by Bishop Octavio Cisneros, Auxiliary Bishop of Brooklyn, New York, who was appointed on 6 June 2006.

Pre-Reformation bishops

Post-Reformation bishops

Church of Ireland succession

Roman Catholic succession

Titular bishops of Eanach Dúin

See also

 Annaghdown Abbey

References

Bibliography

External links
 Annaghdown Cathedral
 Crockford's Clerical Directory – Historical successions

Lists of Anglican bishops and archbishops
Roman Catholic Archdiocese of Tuam
Lists of Irish bishops and archbishops
Diocese of Tuam, Killala and Achonry
Bishops of Tuam or Killala or of Achonry
Bishops of Annaghdown
Catholic titular sees in Europe